The Hatikva Neighborhood Stadium (Itztadion Shkhunat HaTikva) is a multi-purpose stadium in the Hatikva Quarter of Tel Aviv in Israel.

History
The stadium was built in 1951, when the former stadium of Bnei Yehuda was built over. The club was forced to find a different location and its members invaded an abandoned open space to the south of the Hatikva Quarter and built the stadium there. At first, the field was oriented north-south, but the club was forced to re-orient the stadium to south-north, as a building was built on the pitch's north edge.

In 1959, following Bnei Yehuda's promotion to the top division, the ground was renovated and the pitch was converted to a grass surface. A more massive renovation took place between 1965 and 1975, forcing the club to host matches in other venues while work was being done. Shortly before 2000, plastic seats were installed in the stadium's five main stands.

Current status
Bnei Yehuda moved to play at the bigger Bloomfield Stadium in 2004, but their offices remain at the stadium. Between 2006 and 2013, second division club Beitar Tel Aviv (known as Beitar Shimshon Tel Aviv until 2011) played their home matches at the ground. Currently, the ground is home to Liga Alef clubs Maccabi Kabilio Jaffa and Hapoel Kfar Shalem.

See also
Sports in Israel

References

Football venues in Israel
Multi-purpose stadiums in Israel
Bnei Yehuda Tel Aviv F.C.
Sports venues in Tel Aviv